Jakob Kiefer (3 December 1919 – 18 January 1991) was a German gymnast. He competed at the 1952 and 1956 Summer Olympics in all artistic gymnastics events and finished in fourth and fifth place with the German team, respectively. Individually his best achievement was seventh place on the vault in 1956.

During his career he won 12 national titles, on the parallel bars (1950, 1954), pommel horse (1950, 1951 and 1954), rings (1950), vault (1950, 1954), horizontal bar (1950), floor (1950) and allround (1950, 1951).

References

1919 births
1991 deaths
German male artistic gymnasts
Gymnasts at the 1952 Summer Olympics
Gymnasts at the 1956 Summer Olympics
Olympic gymnasts of West Germany
Olympic gymnasts of the United Team of Germany
People from Bad Kreuznach
Sportspeople from Rhineland-Palatinate
20th-century German people